Christopher Marcus McGuthrie (born June 9, 1974) is an American former professional basketball player. He played as a point guard.

McGuthrie played college basketball at Mount St. Mary's University. He was named Northeast Conference Player of the Year in 1996.

While playing for Ricoh Astronauts Amsterdam, he was named MVP of the Dutch Basketball League in the 2000–01 season.

References

External links
ACB.com Profile
Eurobasket.com Profile

1974 births
Living people
21st-century African-American sportspeople
Amsterdam Basketball players
African-American basketball players
American expatriate basketball people in Croatia
American expatriate basketball people in Israel
American expatriate basketball people in the Netherlands
American expatriate basketball people in Spain
American men's basketball players
Basketball players from Washington, D.C.
CB Valladolid players
Donar (basketball club) players
Feyenoord Basketball players
High school basketball coaches in Maryland
KK Šibenik players
Liga ACB players
Maccabi Rishon LeZion basketball players
Mount St. Mary's Mountaineers men's basketball players
Point guards
20th-century African-American sportspeople